"Kate" is a song performed by Ben Folds Five released on their 1997 album  Whatever and Ever Amen. Written by Ben Folds, Darren Jessee, and Folds's first wife, Anna Goodman, the song follows a love-struck man who is so obsessed with the girl "Kate" that he longs to be her, as shown by the lyric "I wanna be Kate". It peaked at #39 on the UK Singles Chart.

Music video

The video features the three band members cuddled up in bed, snoozing and singing.

The entire video was shot in one take, from a camera over the bed, facing straight down.

References

1997 singles
1997 songs
Ben Folds Five songs
Epic Records singles
Songs written by Anna Goodman
Songs written by Ben Folds